The 1981 LPGA Championship was the 27th LPGA Championship, played June 11–14 at Jack Nicklaus Golf Center at Kings Island in Mason, Ohio, a suburb northeast of Cincinnati.

Donna Caponi sank a  birdie putt on the final green to win her second LPGA Championship, a stroke ahead of runners-up Jerilyn Britz and Pat Meyers. It was Caponi's fourth and final

Past champions in the field

Made the cut

Source:

Missed the cut

Source:

Final leaderboard
Sunday, June 14, 1981

Source:

References

External links
Golf Observer leaderboard
The Golf Center at Kings Island

Women's PGA Championship
Golf in Ohio
LPGA Championship
LPGA Championship
LPGA Championship
LPGA Championship
Women's sports in Ohio